New Year Dash!! is a professional wrestling event held annually by New Japan Pro-Wrestling (NJPW). It is held every year the day after Wrestle Kingdom, the biggest show of the year for New Japan, starting at Wrestle Kingdom 8 in 2014. There have been eight events under the name held so far, with the traditional January 5 date.  In 2020 and 2021, with Wrestle Kingdom a two night event, New Year Dash!! was held January 6. The event was not held in 2022, with the intended return to a one-day Wrestle Kingdom for 2023, the event will return to January 5.

Production

Background 
New Year Dash!! is traditionally held at Korakuen Hall, a prestigious venue right next to the Tokyo Dome, where Wrestle Kingdom is held. The 2020 edition, however, was held at Ota City General Gymnasium due to the event being the official retirement ceremony for Jyushin Thunder Liger. The 2021 edition was held at Tokyo Dome City Hall, another venue right next to the Dome.

Storylines
New Year Dash!! features professional wrestling matches that involved different wrestlers from pre-existing scripted feuds and storylines. Wrestlers portray villains, heroes, or less distinguishable characters in scripted events that built tension and culminated in a wrestling match or series of matches. New Year Dash!! is the night were New Japan Pro-Wrestling starts many new storylines and feuds after most have ended the night before at Wrestle Kingdom. Dash!! is an exciting show, where fans tune in to see how the promotion will start the year in terms of stories leading into the New Beginning shows. Because of its "reset"-like nature after the company's biggest show of the year, many fans see Dash!! as NJPW's equivalent to the first Raw after WrestleMania in WWE.

Date and venues

Results

2014

2015

2016

2017

2018

2019

2020

2021

2023

References

External links
New Japan Pro-Wrestling Official website

Professional wrestling in Tokyo
New Japan Pro-Wrestling shows